Roxy by Proxy is a live album by Frank Zappa, recorded in December 1973 at The Roxy Theatre in Hollywood, California and released posthumously in March 2014 by The Zappa Family Trust on Zappa Records.

History
In September 1974, parts of the five shows on December 8, 9 & 10, 1973 (early and late shows on 9th and 10th) at The Roxy Theatre in West Hollywood, California were released on the double-LP set Roxy & Elsewhere, along with music recorded a few months later (on May 8, 1974 at the Edinboro State College, Edinboro, Pennsylvania and on May 11, 1974 at the Auditorium Theatre in Chicago, Illinois), with all of that material being overdubbed and remixed.

Roxy by Proxy consists of unreleased material recorded live from the four shows held on December 9 & 10, 1973 at The Roxy (early and late shows).  The album uses a mix from March/April, 1987 by Bob Stone at the Utility Muffin Research Kitchen.  Roxy by Proxy presents the material without overdubs, closer to what the audiences heard live (some songs are combinations from different shows), and is different from material released on Roxy & Elsewhere in 1974.

Additional material from these shows was released on Roxy The Movie and Roxy the Soundtrack in 2015, with new mix by Bruce Botnick.  All five shows were released in full on The Roxy Performances 7 CD box set in 2018, with audio restoration and 2016 mixes by Craig Parker Adams.

Track listing
All songs produced, composed and realized by Frank Zappa.

Personnel

Musicians
 Frank Zappa – lead guitar, vocals
 George Duke – keyboards, synthesizer, vocals
 Tom Fowler – bass
 Ruth Underwood – percussion
 Bruce Fowler – trombone, dancing (?)
 Napoleon Murphy Brock – tenor sax, flute, vocals
 Ralph Humphrey – drums
 Chester Thompson – drums

Mixing 
 1987 Digital Re-Mix Engineer - Bob Stone, UMRK March/April
 Source: 44.1K 16B 1630 Digital Masters

References 

Frank Zappa live albums
2014 live albums
Live albums published posthumously